Lioptilodes parafuscicostatus is a species of moth in the genus Lioptilodes known from Ecuador and possibly Peru. Moths of this species have a wingspan of approximately 23.5 millimetres. The species closely resembles its sister taxon, Lioptilodes fuscicostata.

References

Platyptiliini
Moths described in 1996
Taxa named by Cees Gielis